

The Ra-Son Warrior or X-3 Warrior is a low wing bushplane with a large short coupled tail surface.

Design
The aircraft has a large tapered low wing, with a large horizontal tail surface mounted close to the trailing edge of the wing and conventional tailwheel landing gear. The fuselage has welded steel tube construction with fabric covering. The wings have fabric-covered wooden ribs and spars. A 1,000 lb (454 kg) payload can be lifted by the 185 hp (138 kW) engine. The five-seat cabin can be converted for cargo operations, and two oversized gullwing cabin doors allow loading.

Operational history
The prototype was built over a four-year period. The aircraft received the Experimental Aircraft Association award for achievement in 1963.

Specifications (Ra-Son Warrior)

References

1940s United States civil utility aircraft
Low-wing aircraft
Aircraft first flown in 1947
Single-engined tractor aircraft